Mathías Palomeque (born 7 October 1986) is a Uruguayan rugby union player. He was named in Uruguay's squad for the 2015 Rugby World Cup.

References

1986 births
Living people
Uruguayan rugby union players
Uruguay international rugby union players
People from San José de Mayo
Rugby union locks